Daniela Iacobelli (born November 27, 1987) is an American professional golfer who has played on the Epson Tour and LPGA Tour.

Early life and education
Iacobelli was born in Detroit, Michigan. She played college golf at Florida Institute of Technology where she won eight times including the 2007 NCAA Division II Championship. She graduated in 2009.

Professional career
Iacobelli turned professional in 2010 and was played mainly on the Symetra Tour, winning three times: 2012 Daytona Beach Invitational, 2015 Tullymore Classic, and 2019 Island Resort Championship. She played on the LPGA Tour in 2013, 2016, and 2018 with a best finish of 9th at the 2018 Lotte Championship.

Professional wins

Epson Tour wins
2012 Daytona Beach Invitational
2015 Tullymore Classic
2019 Island Resort Championship
2022 Wildhorse Ladies Golf Classic

References

External links

American female golfers
LPGA Tour golfers
Golfers from Detroit
Florida Institute of Technology alumni
1987 births
Living people
21st-century American women